Seal Sands Power Station (also known as Viking Power Station) is a gas-fired gas turbine power station situated on the River Tees at Seal Sands near Billingham, in the borough of Stockton-on-Tees, which is part of County Durham, North East England.

Operations
Construction of the plant began in 1997, it was built as a collaboration between National Power and Kværner Construction, costing £25 million to construct. When it opened in the spring of 1999, it used the first Rolls-Royce Trent engine to be put into industrial service. The station uses a single 50 megawatt gas turbine, which is fueled by natural gas. Northern Electric originally supplied the gas for the station, as well as distributing the electricity generated. The plant has a 40% efficiency at 15 °C. As of September 2004, PX Limited have maintained the station, while Viking Power own the station.

References

Power stations in North East England
Buildings and structures in County Durham